Mosi or MOSI may refer to:

 Mosi (given name)
 Mosi (surname)
 Molybdenum silicide (MoSi2), an important material in the semiconductor industry
 MOSI protocol, an extension of the basic MSI cache coherency protocol
 MOSI, Master Out Slave In (data output from master), Serial Peripheral Interface pin and logic signal
 Museum of Science and Industry (MOSI), former name of the Science and Industry Museum in Manchester, England
 Mosi (beer)
 Master Output, Slave Input, a data line in SPI.

See also
 Museum of Science and Industry (disambiguation), several museums